Heteronarce is a genus of sleeper rays in the family Narkidae.  This genus is found only in the western Indian Ocean along the coasts of Africa, the Arabian Peninsula and India.

Species 
There are currently four recognized species in this genus:
 Heteronarce bentuviai Baranes & J. E. Randall, 1989 (Elat electric ray)
 Heteronarce garmani Regan, 1921 (Natal electric ray)
 Heteronarce mollis Lloyd, 1907 (Soft electric ray)
 Heteronarce prabhui Talwar, 1981 (Quilon electric ray)

References 

Narkidae
Ray genera
Taxa named by Charles Tate Regan
Strongly electric fish